Elections to North West Leicestershire District Council took place on 1 May 2003, with the previous election having taken place in 1999 and with the next held in May 2007. The election took place across all 20 electoral wards and a total of 38 councillors were elected. The Labour Party retained control of the council for the fourth election in a row, albeit with a narrow majority of two seats.

Results

|}

Ward results
In wards that are represented by more than one councillor, electors were given more than one vote each, hence the voter turnout may not match the number of votes cast.

References

2003
2003 English local elections
2000s in Leicestershire